NOSM is an acronym and may refer to:
The Northern Ontario School of Medicine, a medical school in Ontario, Canada
The Navy Occupation Service Medal, an American military award
The graffiti name of Davide Perre, a New York artist